Home to Stay  is a 1978 Canadian-American made-for-television drama film directed by Delbert Mann and starring Henry Fonda, Michael McGuire and Frances Hyland. It was originally broadcast on CBS on May 1, 1978.

Plot
Fonda portrays "an old man who runs away from home with his young granddaughter rather than be placed in an old folks home.

Filming Locations

 Seagrave, Ontario- the bed and breakfast
 12 Scugog Line- the farm
 Toronto, Ontario- the city scenes

Cast
Henry Fonda as Grandpa George
Michael McGuire as Frank McDermott
Frances Hyland as Aunt Martha
David Stambaugh as Joey Brewster
Pixie Bigelow as Clara Hirshman
Louis Del Grande as Richard
Trudy Young 	as Hildy
Doris Petrie as Mrs. Strickmeyer
Eleanor Beecroft as Frances
Kristen Vigard as Sarah
Dave Thomas 	as Petrie
David Hughes as Bill Brewster
Judy Sinclair as Edith Brewster
Len Doncheff as Farmer
James D. Morris as Policeman

References

External links
 

English-language Canadian films
1978 television films
1978 films
1978 drama films
Canadian drama television films
CBS network films
Films directed by Delbert Mann
1970s Canadian films
1970s English-language films
English-language drama films